Thorsten Gauffin (2 June 1901 – 28 November 1970) was a Finnish chess player, Finnish Chess Championship winner (1937).

Biography
In the 1930s Thorsten Gauffin was one of Finland's leading chess players. In 1937, in Helsinki he won Finnish Chess Championship. He was best known for his victories at the 1937 Chess Olympiad over the reigning World Chess Champion Max Euwe and grandmaster Paul Keres.

Thorsten Gauffin played for Finland in the Chess Olympiads:
 In 1930, at fourth board in the 3rd Chess Olympiad in Hamburg (+3, =1, -10),
 In 1937, at first board in the 7th Chess Olympiad in Stockholm (+2, =4, -8).

References

External links

Thorsten Gauffin chess games at 365chess.com

1901 births
1970 deaths
Sportspeople from Turku
Finnish chess players
Chess Olympiad competitors
20th-century chess players